Part Time Wife is a 1930 American pre-Code comedy film directed by Leo McCarey and written by Howard J. Green, Leo McCarey and Raymond L. Schrock. The film stars Edmund Lowe, Leila Hyams, Tommy Clifford, Walter McGrail, Louis Payne and Sam Lufkin. The film was released on December 28, 1930, by Fox Film Corporation.

Plot
Jim Murdock's marriage is in trouble after he neglects his wife, particularly her attraction to golf. With tips from Irish caddy Tommy Milligan on how to play the game on the course and at home, Jim challenges his estranged wife to a match and demonstrates that he's a changed man.

Cast      
Edmund Lowe as Jim B. Murdock
Leila Hyams as Mrs. Murdock
Tommy Clifford as Tommy Milligan 
Walter McGrail as Johnny Spence
Louis Payne as Deveney 
Sam Lufkin as Caddie Master
Bodil Rosing as Martha

References

External links
 

1930 films
1930s English-language films
Fox Film films
American comedy films
1930 comedy films
Films directed by Leo McCarey
American black-and-white films
Golf films
1930s American films